Shlomi Elkabetz (born 5 December 1972) is an Israeli actor, writer and director. He is known for playing Simon in HBO's Our Boys.

Early life
Elkabetz mother was a hairdresser and his father was a postal employee. His parents were Moroccan Jews who immigrated to Israel. Elkabetz was the youngest of four children. His older sister was the late actress Ronit Elkabetz.

Career
Elkabetz is best known for his Vivian Amsalem trilogy comprising the films, To Take a Wife, Shiva and Gett: The Trial of Viviane Amsalem. Elkabetz co-wrote and co-directed the films with his older sister, Ronit Elkabetz, who also starred in the films as Viviane Amsalem, an unhappy Israeli housewife trapped in a marriage with a pious man she cannot stand. The films were loosely based on the relationship between the Elkabetz's parents.

Elkabetz also directed the 2011 film, Edut, which again starred his sister.

In 2016 he produced the film In Between.

Elkabetz made his acting debut as the lead in the 2019 series, Our Boys.

Personal life
Since the age of 21, Elkabetz splits his time between Tel Aviv and Paris.

He lives in Tel Aviv with his partner Yuval, and is the father of a daughter, Rene Lilian Elkabetz Dori, co-parenting with the singer Dikla.

Awards and recognition

References

External links

1972 births
Living people
Israeli male television actors
Israeli film directors
Israeli male screenwriters
Israeli people of Moroccan-Jewish descent
20th-century Moroccan Jews
Academic staff of Sapir Academic College
Israeli expatriates in France
Israeli gay writers
Israeli gay actors
Israeli gay artists
LGBT film directors
Israeli LGBT screenwriters
Gay Jews
Gay screenwriters